The 2014 January Heart of Dallas Bowl was an American college football bowl game that was played on January 1, 2014, at the Cotton Bowl at Fair Park in Dallas, Texas. The fourth edition of the Heart of Dallas Bowl, it featured the UNLV Rebels of the Mountain West Conference against the North Texas Mean Green of Conference USA.  The game began at 11:00 a.m. CST and aired on ESPNU. It was one of the 2013–14 bowl games that concluded the 2013 FBS football season.  The game was sponsored by PlainsCapital Bank and was officially known as the Heart of Dallas Bowl Presented by PlainsCapital Bank.

North Texas defeated UNLV by a score of 36–14. It was their first bowl win since 2002.

UNLV finished the regular season with a record of 7–5 (5–3 MWC), tied for third place in the Mountain West Conference West Division.  North Texas had a record of 8–4 (6–2 C-USA) and were tied for second place in the Conference USA West Division.  This was the fifth all-time meeting between the two teams, and the first victory of the series for North Texas.

UNLV Rebels

In a year that saw UNLV achieve its first winning season since the turn of the millennium and the rightful return of the Fremont Cannon to Las Vegas, the Rebels accepted an invitation to the Heart of Dallas Bowl after finishing 7–5 overall and 5–3 in Mountain West Conference Play.  It was their first bowl eligible season since 2000 when they played in the Las Vegas Bowl, defeating the Arkansas Razorbacks, 31–14. It is also the first time in nearly 30 years that the Rebels played in an away bowl game.  The Rebels, who are 3–0 in bowl games, had won all four previous meetings with the Mean Green.

North Texas Mean Green

The Mean Green's first season as a member of Conference USA was also their best in several years, seeing the team finishing 8–4 overall and 6–2 in conference play (tied with the UTSA Roadrunners for second in the C-USA West Division).  At season's end, bowl director Brant Ringler extended an invitation to the Mean Green, located only 40 miles to the northwest in Denton, to play in the game.

In addition to being North Texas' first Heart of Dallas Bowl, this was their first bowl game since the 2004 New Orleans Bowl saw them lose to the Southern Miss Golden Eagles by a score of 31–10.  It was also their first New Year's Day bowl game since the 1948 Salad Bowl (when they were known as North Texas State Teachers College) saw them lose to the Nevada Wolf Pack by a score of 13–6.

Game summary

Scoring summary

Statistics

References

External links
 Game summary at ESPN

Heart of Dallas Bowl
First Responder Bowl
UNLV Rebels football bowl games
North Texas Mean Green football bowl games
Heart of Dallas Bowl
Heart of Dallas Bowl 01
2010s in Dallas
2014 in Texas